Posadowsky Glacier is a glacier which flows to the north coast of the island of Bouvetøya in the Southern Atlantic Ocean. It is  1 nautical mile (1.9 km) eastward of Cape Circoncision.

It was first charted and named by the Gauss Expedition under Erich von Drygalski, which visited the island in February 1902. Posadowsky Glacier was named for Count Arthur von Posadowsky-Wehner, Secretary of the Interior of the German Empire, who was instrumental in obtaining a government grant to cover the cost of the Drygalski expedition.

See also
 List of glaciers in the Antarctic
 Glaciology

References

Glaciers of Bouvet Island